The Line: a man's experience; a son's quest to understand is a memoir written by Arch and Martin Flanagan. It details Arch Flanagan's experiences as an Australian prisoner of war of Imperial Japan during World War II. The Line is broken up into different parts, with areas written by Martin italicised, whilst areas written by Arch are not.

It is currently being studied by many VCE students across Victoria.
For Victorians, it is one of the books which is studied in Encountering Conflict a theme which is presented in the end of year exams for VCE students (2008 -).

Summary

Cleveland 1914-1928
A short history of Arch's childhood growing up in rural Tasmania

The War Years 1940-1945 and Long Long Ago
Most of the memoir is composed of these sections which contain various situations that Arch remembers from his time in the war.

Tribute to Weary
A tribute written by Arch in memory of Edward (Weary) Dunlop.

Brother's Keeper
A short work of fiction written by Arch.

References
The Line: a man's experience; a son's quest to understand - 

2005 non-fiction books
Australian memoirs
World War II memoirs